Timothy Thomas may refer to:

Timothy, Tim, or Timmy Thomas may refer to:

Timothy Thomas (record producer), part of duo R. City with his brother Theron Thomas
 Timothy Thomas, an unarmed African American man shot and killed by a Cincinnati Police Department patrolman sparking the Cincinnati riots of 2001
 Tim Thomas (athlete) (born 1973), Welsh pole vaulter
 Tim Thomas (basketball) (born 1977), American professional basketball player
 Tim Thomas (ice hockey, born 1963), American ice hockey defenseman
 Tim Thomas (ice hockey, born 1974), American professional ice hockey goaltender
 Tim Thomas (kickboxer) (born 1983), Muay Thai kickboxer
 Timmy Thomas (1944–2022), American R&B singer

Fictional characters
Reverend Tim Tom, a character from the TV sitcom The Middle
Timothy Thomas Turner or Timmy Turner, a main character in The Fairly OddParents

See also
Timothy Thomas Fortune (1856–1928), American orator, civil rights leader, journalist, writer, editor and publisher
Timothy Thomas Ryan (born 1968), American football offensive lineman